The Bismarck Range is a mountain range in the Western Highlands Province of Papua New Guinea. The range is named after the German Chancellor, Otto von Bismarck. From the 1880s to 1914, this part of the island was a German colony.

The highest point is Mount Wilhelm at 4,509 m (14,793 ft). At over 3,400 metres (11,155 ft), the landscape is alpine with tundra, in spite of the tropical climate. The Ramu River has its source in the range.

References 

Mountain ranges of Papua New Guinea